The Breton Party (French: Parti Breton, Breton: Strollad Breizh)  is a social-democratic and social-liberal nationalist party which aspires to the creation of an independent republic of Brittany, within the European Union.

Program
The movement was created in 2002. Its objective is to give Brittany the necessary institutions for its economic, social, cultural, environmental and political development. Brittany is defined as both the modern administrative Région of Brittany and the département of Loire-Atlantique, which includes Nantes, the former capital of the Duchy of Brittany.  Its aspirations include regional autonomy comparable to other European regions as Flanders or Catalonia, or full independence, as with Ireland.

The main idea is that Brittany has always been a nation, therefore has rights and liberties within the European Union. The Breton Party claims the creation of a Breton State, member of the European Union, officially recognized by international authorities. It argues that beyond the principle that a nation should have independent rights, Brittany also has everything to gain by such a process of emancipation, on economic, cultural or environmental fronts.

The slogan of the Breton Party is "emancipated and reunited Brittany". Analyzing the causes for the "stagnation of the Breton political movements", the party wants "to take the Bretons as they are and not as one would like them to be". In terms of the left-right axis, the Breton Party is considered to be centrist. The main objective is first of all to create Breton political institutions. Claiming 400 members, most of whom have had no association with the earlier Breton movement, the Breton Party has members from the center-left, such as the professor and the contractor Jean-Paul Moisan from Nantes, or the center-right, such as Gérard Olliéric, the current president of the party.

Youth Wing
Ar Vretoned Yaouank is the youth section of the party created in 2007. Its purpose is to lead activities specific to youth connected to the party, but in an informal way. In 2006 the Young Bretons participated in the International Youth Days organized by the Basque National Party in Bilbao and were received by the Lehendakari, leader of the Basque government.

Elections
The Breton Party has contested several elections: two by-elections in 2004, and again in 2005. Its candidates obtained for their first outing between 1.5% and 4% of the vote.

In the general election of 2007, 4 candidates were put forward:

Yves Le Mestric for the constituency of Vitré (Ille-et-Vilaine): 686 votes or 0.89%
Gérard Guillemot for the constituency of Rennes (Ille-et-Vilaine): 249 votes or 0.57%
Emile Granville for the constituency of Redon (Ille-et-Vilaine): 847 votes or 1.27%
Hervé Le Guen for the constituency of Lorient (Morbihan): 686 votes or 1.44%

In a local by-election in Redon on September 23, 2007, Émile Granville obtained 3.58%. In a 2009 by-election in the same canton, he won 4.08%.

In 2008, Yann Jestin, president of Askol, obtained 25.18% of the votes during the cantonal elections in Lesneven.

During the municipal elections in March 2008, the Breton Party ran about twenty candidates and obtained about ten municipal elected representatives among whom were a mayor and three deputies.

In the 2009 European elections, the party ran one list in the West constituency, which won 2.45% across the five Breton departments. Its highest result was 3.41% in the Finistère. It won up to 16% in a commune in the Côtes-d'Armor department.

In the 2010 French regional elections the Breton Party fielded candidates in Brittany and the Pays de Loire regions, viz;

Christian Troadec for the presidency of Brittany: 47,108 votes or 4.29%
Jacky Flippot for the presidency of Pays de Loire: 11,669 votes or 0.99% (most from the city of Nantes)

At the 2017 legislative elections, the Breton Party presented candidates in all the 31 circonscriptions of Brittany with its ally Alliance Ecologiste Indépendante. The vote took place juste after Emmanuel Macron's election as president of France and was then difficult for other parties than the new head of state's LREM, but the Breton Party got more than 1% in 10 of them.

2021 Regional Elections 

The Breton Party obtained 1.55% of the votes and came 9th out of 13 in an election strongly marked by abstention. A result which does not make it possible to maintain the second place but which is distinguished by a number of votes twice as high compared to 2015 with 13,193 votes in the Brittany region (compared to 6,521 votes in 2015).

External links
Official site (in French and Breton)

2002 establishments in France
Breton nationalist parties
Political parties established in 2002
Political parties in Brittany
Pro-European political parties in France
Pro-independence parties
Secessionist organizations in Europe
Separatism in France
Social democratic parties in France